Megachile crandalli is a species of bee in the family Megachilidae. It was described by Mitchell in 1957.

References

Cradalli
Insects described in 1957